Hands Across the Border is a 1944 American Western film directed by Joseph Kane and starring Roy Rogers.

Plot summary

Cast
Roy Rogers as Roy Rogers
Trigger as Trigger, Adams' horse
Ruth Terry as Kim Adams
Guinn "Big Boy" Williams as Teddy Bear
Onslow Stevens as Brock Danvers
Mary Treen as Sophie Lawrence
Joseph Crehan as Jeff "Bet-a-Hundred" Adams
Duncan Renaldo as Juan Morales
LeRoy Mason as Sheriff
Janet Martin as Rosita Morales
Harry Wiere as Harry
Herbert Wiere as Herby
Sylvester Wiere as Sylvester
Bob Nolan as Bob
Sons of the Pioneers as Musicians

Soundtrack
 "Hands Across the Border" (Music by Hoagy Carmichael, lyrics by Ned Washington)
 "Dreaming to Music" (Music by Phil Ohman, lyrics by Ned Washington)
 "The Girl with the High Button Shoes" (Music by Phil Ohman, lyrics by Ned Washington)
 "When Your Heart's on Easy Street" (Music by Phil Ohman, lyrics by Ned Washington)
 "Hey, Hey (It's A Great Day)" (Music by Phil Ohman, lyrics by Ned Washington)
 "Ay, Jalisco, no te rajes!" (Music by Manuel Esperón, lyrics by Ernesto Cortázar)

See also
List of American films of 1944

External links

1944 films
1944 Western (genre) films
American black-and-white films
Republic Pictures films
American Western (genre) films
Films directed by Joseph Kane
1940s English-language films
1940s American films